Teresa Ganzel is an American actress and comedian.

Career
Ganzel was a recurring cast member of The Tonight Show Starring Johnny Carson as the Matinee Lady in the "Tea Time Movie" skits. She has often played stereotypical ditzy blonde bimbo roles, including Greedy Gretchen in the Three's Company episode "Lies My Roommate Told Me" (1981), National Lampoon's Movie Madness (1982), the film The Toy (1982) with Jackie Gleason and Richard Pryor, and the Married... with Children episode "A Three Job, No Income Family" (1989).

In 1984, Ganzel played another young and ditzy blonde, Sheree Winkler, in the short-lived sitcom The Duck Factory, which introduced Jim Carrey to American audiences. She was a frequent game show celebrity in the 1980s, particularly on the $25,000 and $100,000 incarnations of Pyramid, as well as a recurring celebrity on the 1986–1989 version of Hollywood Squares. She also appeared as a celebrity in the game show pilot for Money in the Blank (1987).

Ganzel has had several voice-over roles in cartoons, animated movies, and series, including Cow and Chicken, The Emperor's New School, Monsters, Inc., Goof Troop, Aaahh!!! Real Monsters, Rugrats, and Horton Hears a Who!. Her first voice role was as Kitty Glitter in Top Cat and the Beverly Hills Cats. Ganzel voices Miss Vavoom, the 1990s revival of Red Hot Riding Hood, in Tom & Jerry Kids and Droopy, Master Detective.

In 2010, Ganzel played a principal role in the off-Broadway production of Viagara Falls (2010) after appearing in the same role, Jacqueline Tempest, in productions of the play staged in other cities.

On April 20, 2016, Ganzel appeared on Ken Reid's TV Guidance Counselor podcast.

Reputation
TV writer Mark Evanier said: "[Ganzel] took the Matinee Lady from being someone to be ogled and laughed-at because her I.Q. was lower than her bra-size to being a skilled comic actress playing that kind of character...This all may wind up to a tiny milestone in the evolution of women on TV but I think it's quite real and that Teresa deserves some real credit."

Selected roles
Three's Company (1981) (TV Series) ... Greedy Gretchen
My Favorite Year (1982) ... Dumpling
The Toy (1982) ... Fancy Bates
The Tonight Show Starring Johnny Carson ... Tea Time Movie Lady (1982–1991)
National Lampoon Goes to the Movies (1982) ... Diana
The Duck Factory (1984) (TV series) ... Mrs. Sheree Winkler
Three's a Crowd (1985) (TV series) ... Greedy Gretchen
Transylvania 6-5000 (1985)... Elizabeth Ellison
Newhart (1986) (TV series) ... Kathy Newman (episode: "Torn Between Three Brothers")
Fresno (1986) (TV miniseries) ... Bobbi Jo Bobb
Roxie (1987) (TV series) ... Marcie McKinley
Top Cat and the Beverly Hills Cats (1987) (animated TV movie) ... Kitty Glitter
The New Yogi Bear Show (1988) ... Additional voices
Mama's Family (1989) ... Heather
Married... with Children (1989) ... Heather (episode: "A Three Job, No Income Family")
The Smurfs (1989) ... Additional voices
The Dave Thomas Comedy Show (1990) ... Regular
Monsters (American TV series) (1990)... Debbie in "Murray's Monster" episode 
Tom & Jerry Kids (1990–94) ... Miss Vavoom and others
Droopy, Master Detective (1993–94) ... Miss Vavoom
Mike Hammer, Private Eye (1998) ... Livia Sterling Randolph (episode: "A New Leaf: Part 2")
I Am Weasel (1998) ... Loullabelle
Rugrats (1998) ... Colleen McNulty (episode: "A Very McNulty Birthday")
Monsters, Inc. (2001) ... Betty (voice)
Clifford's Really Big Movie (2004) ... Liz
EverQuest II (2004 computer game) ... 13 voice roles
The Emperor's New School (2006) ... Princess Lalala
Surf's Up (2007) ... Female Penguin #2s
Horton Hears a Who! (2008) ... Female Who #2
Wall·e (2008) ...  Additional voices
Up (2009) ... Additional voices
Random! Cartoons (2009) ... Lulu
Toy Story 3 (2010) ... Additional voices
Monsters University (2013) ... Gladys
Inside Out (2015) ... Additional voices
Despicable Me 3 (2017) ... Additional voices
Side Hustle (2022) (TV series) ... Gladys (episode: "We Have a Bingo!")

References

External links
 

Living people
Actresses from Toledo, Ohio
American film actresses
American stage actresses
American television actresses
American video game actresses
American voice actresses
American women comedians
Comedians from Ohio
Year of birth missing (living people)
20th-century American actresses
21st-century American actresses
20th-century American comedians
21st-century American comedians